Bayport is an unincorporated community and census-designated place (CDP) in Hernando County, Florida, United States. The population was 43 at the 2010 census.

Geography
Bayport is located in western Hernando County along the Gulf of Mexico at  (28.548454, -82.645345). Cortez Boulevard, the main road to the community, leads east  to U.S. Route 19 at Weeki Wachee.

Demographics

As of the census of 2000, there were 36 people, 16 households, and 10 families residing in the CDP. The racial makeup of the CDP was 100% White  (U.S. Census)|

There were 16 households, out of which 37.5% had children under the age of 18 living with them, 56.3% were married couples living together, 6.3% had a female householder with no husband present, and 37.5% were non-families. 18.8% of all households were made up of individuals, and none had someone living alone who was 65 years of age or older. The average household size was 2.25 and the average family size was 2.60.

In the CDP, the population was spread out, with 19.4% under the age of 18, 27.8% from 25 to 44, 44.4% from 45 to 64, and 8.3% who were 65 years of age or older. The median age was 46 years. For every 100 females, there were 89.5 males. For every 100 females age 18 and over, there were 93.3 males.

The median income for a household in the CDP was $30,250, and the median income for a family was $31,750. Males had a median income of $0 versus $16,250 for females. The per capita income for the CDP was $11,396. There were no families and 25.0% of the population living below the poverty line, including no under eighteens and none of those over 64.

History
The village of Bayport, located at the mouth of the Weeki Wachee River, sprang up in the early 1850s as a supply and cotton port. During the Civil War, Union naval squadrons blockaded Florida's coasts to prevent goods and supplies from passing into and out of the state. By 1863 the East Gulf Blockade Squadron had effectively closed the larger ports along the Gulf Coast. Small rivers, such as the Weeki Wachee, became important trade routes. Shipping at Bayport attracted the attention of the Union Blockade Squadron which intercepted eleven blockade runners near there between 1862 and 1865. Various skirmishes took place at Bayport between Union troops and the Confederate Home Guard during the course of the war. This included at least one raid by Union troops who had marched all the way north from Fort Myers. The Confederate cannon battery site can still be seen on the wooded point just north of the Bayport fishing pier at the mouth of the Weeki Wachee River.

After the war Bayport became Hernando County's major outlet for lumber and agricultural products, and continued to serve as its transportation center until railroad service came to Brooksville in 1885.

Since that time, Bayport has primarily served as a retreat for area fishermen, and many families from nearby Brooksville have weekend homes and fishing camps in the area. Redfish, trout and snook exist in abundance in Bayport's waters. Tarpon and cobia are seasonal visitors. However, the extremely treacherous, rocky seafloor and shallow marsh creeks can be dangerous for the uninformed angler or pleasure boater. In the spring of 2008, Hernando County and the Southwest Florida Water Management District rebuilt Bayport's marina and park area.

References

Unincorporated communities in Hernando County, Florida
Unincorporated communities in Florida
Census-designated places in Hernando County, Florida
Census-designated places in Florida
Populated coastal places in Florida on the Gulf of Mexico
Former county seats in Florida